Izyumsky Uyezd was one of the subdivisions of the Kharkov Governorate of the Russian Empire. It was situated in the southeastern part of the governorate. Its administrative centre was Izium (Izyum).

Demographics
At the time of the Russian Empire Census of 1897, Izyumsky Uyezd had a population of 280,474. Of these, 86.2% spoke Ukrainian, 12.0% Russian, 1.5% German, 0.1% Yiddish and 0.1% Polish as their native language.

References

 
Uezds of Kharkov Governorate
Kharkov Governorate